Baggrow railway station was in the former county of Cumberland, now Cumbria, England. It was a stop on the Bolton Loop (sometimes referred to as the "Mealsgate Loop") of the Maryport and Carlisle Railway.

The station served the village and Brayton Knowle Colliery and was described in Bradshaw's as the "Station for Blennerhasset".

History
The line and station were opened by the Maryport and Carlisle Railway primarily to access collieries in the Bolton Coalfield and to head off rival attempts to access this potential traffic by the North British Railway-backed Silloth Company. The line and station became part of the London, Midland and Scottish Railway (LMSR) at the Grouping of 1923.  The station was closed by that company some seven years later, although freight continued to pass through to Mealsgate until 1952.

Passenger services
Services to Baggrow varied a great deal over its existence. There were some through trains, but more goods and passenger trains ran as if there was a gap. In fact there was a gap from 1869 to 1872 when a section of line was lifted east of Mealsgate.

No mention of any Sunday service appears in the literature.

The passenger service of two weekday trains each way between Mealsgate and Aspatria, calling at Baggrow, began on Boxing Day 1866, and appeared in Bradshaw (as "Blaggrow") from January 1867, under the heading "Bolton Branch". The journey time from Mealsgate to Aspatria was fifteen minutes. With minor timing changes this remained the service until 1876.

In 1877 an extra train was added on Friday afternoons.

From November 1878 timetables were re-titled "Bolton Loop" and the service was enhanced:
 on Mondays, Tuesdays and Saturdays the first train to Aspatria started from 
 the Fridays Only train ran through to High Blaithwaite, and

August 1887 appeared to be the line's passenger high water mark. All trains called at all intermediate stations, with
 a basic service of three trains between Mealsgate and Aspatria, Monday to Saturday
 the first train to Aspatria on Monday and Saturday started from High Blaithwaite
 an extra train ran between Aspatria and Mealsgate on Tuesdays and Fridays
 Monday, Tuesday and Saturday the 16:20 from Aspatria ran through to High Blaithwaite
 except on Tuesdays, a train ran through from Aspatria to Wigton and back
 on Tuesdays only the first morning train from Aspatria ran through to Wigton, returning later in the morning

By 1912 no through trains ran over the loop between Aspatria and Wigton.
 five plied between Mealsgate and Aspatria
 one of these - the 16:45 from Aspatria - ran through to High Blaithwaite on Mondays, Tuesdays and Saturdays
 at 08:50 a train ran east from Mealsgate to Wigton, returning at 09:55, taking 16 minutes

High Blaithwaite closed in 1921, though a weekday train from Mealsgate to Wigton and back continued to run. There were six trains a day between Aspatria and Mealsgate.

Whether this was an additional stop for existing trains or additional trains has yet to be confirmed, as have the service's start and end dates. The stopping place at the colliery never achieved advertised public passenger service status.

Apart from the colliers' service, by July 1922 the public passenger service (under the heading "Aspatria and Wigton") had evolved to a simple six trains a day - the "Baggra Bus" - plying between Aspatria and Mealsgate, all calling at Baggrow, with no variations by day. Wigton appears in the table, but no trains served it by this route.

Passenger trains along the remaining part of the loop were withdrawn in 1930, with no residual parcels service. Baggrow was closed completely, but Mealsgate remained open for goods; this petered out in 1952, after which the tracks were lifted east of Baggrow. A section west of Baggrow survived for several more years as a long siding.

Afterlife
Although the station itself has been demolished, in 2013 the Station Master's house was still in use as a private dwelling.

See also

 Maryport & Carlisle Railway

References

Sources

Further reading

External links
 The station on an Edwardian OS map National Library of Scotland
 Baggrow on a navigable 1946 O. S. map a npe Maps
 The station and line Rail Map Online
 The station and the branch, with mileages Railway Codes

Railway stations in Great Britain opened in 1866
Railway stations in Great Britain closed in 1930
Former Maryport and Carlisle Railway stations
Disused railway stations in Cumbria
1866 establishments in England